Alpha-1,3/1,6-mannosyltransferase ALG2 is an enzyme that is encoded by the ALG2 gene.  Mutations in the human gene are associated with congenital defects in glycosylation  The protein encoded by the ALG2 gene belongs to two classes of enzymes: GDP-Man:Man1GlcNAc2-PP-dolichol alpha-1,3-mannosyltransferase and GDP-Man:Man2GlcNAc2-PP-dolichol alpha-1,6-mannosyltransferase.

Function 

This gene encodes a member of the glycosyltransferase 1 family. The encoded protein acts as an alpha 1,3 mannosyltransferase, mannosylating Man(2)GlcNAc(2)-dolichol diphosphate and Man(1)GlcNAc(2)-dolichol diphosphate to form Man(3)GlcNAc(2)-dolichol diphosphate. Defects in this gene have been associated with congenital disorder of glycosylation type Ih (CDG-Ii).

Interactions 

ALG2 has been shown to interact with  ANXA7 and ANXA11.

References

Further reading 

 
 
  NB ALG-2 is NOT the protein product of the ALG2 gene.
  NB ALG-2 is NOT the protein product of the ALG2 gene.
 
  NB ALG-2 is NOT the protein product of the ALG2 gene.
  NB ALG-2 is NOT the protein product of the ALG2 gene.
 
  NB ALG-2 is NOT the protein product of the ALG2 gene.

External links 
  GeneReviews/NCBI/NIH/UW entry on Congenital Disorders of Glycosylation Overview